1159 Granada, provisional designation , is a dark background asteroid and relatively slow rotator from the inner regions of the asteroid belt, approximately 30 kilometers in diameter. It was discovered on 2 September 1929, by astronomer Karl Reinmuth at the Heidelberg Observatory in southwest Germany. The asteroid was named for the Spanish city and province of Granada.

Orbit and classification 

Granada is a background asteroid that does not belong to any known asteroid family. It orbits the Sun in the inner main-belt at a distance of 2.2–2.5 AU once every 3 years and 8 months (1,341 days). Its orbit has an eccentricity of 0.06 and an inclination of 13° with respect to the ecliptic. The body's observation arc begins nine days after its official discovery observation at Heidelberg.

Physical characteristics 

Although Granada is an assumed S-type asteroid, it has a notably low albedo (see below) for an asteroid of the inner main-belt, even below that of most carbonaceous asteroids.

Slow rotation 

In September 1984, a rotational lightcurve of Granada was obtained from photometric observations by astronomer Richard Binzel. Lightcurve analysis gave a rotation period of 31 hours with a brightness variation of 0.28 magnitude. In October 2010, photometric observations in the R-band by astronomers at the Palomar Transient Factory gave a period of 72.852 hours and an amplitude of 0.24. While not being a slow rotator, Granadas period is significantly longer than the typical 2 to 20 hours measures for most asteroids.

Diameter and albedo 

According to the surveys carried out by the Infrared Astronomical Satellite IRAS, the Japanese Akari satellite and the NEOWISE mission of NASA's Wide-field Infrared Survey Explorer, Granada measures between 27.839 and 34.65 kilometers in diameter and its surface has a low albedo between 0.028 and 0.0471.

The Collaborative Asteroid Lightcurve Link derives an albedo of 0.0439 and a diameter of 29.94 kilometers based on an absolute magnitude of 11.63.

Naming 

This minor planet was named after Granada, city and province in Andalusia in southern. The official naming citation was mentioned in The Names of the Minor Planets by Paul Herget in 1955.

References

External links 
 Asteroid Lightcurve Database (LCDB), query form (info )
 Dictionary of Minor Planet Names, Google books
 Asteroids and comets rotation curves, CdR – Observatoire de Genève, Raoul Behrend
 Discovery Circumstances: Numbered Minor Planets (1)-(5000) – Minor Planet Center
 
 

001159
Discoveries by Karl Wilhelm Reinmuth
Named minor planets
19290902